Cordelia is a feminine given name. It was borne by the tragic heroine of Shakespeare's King Lear (1606), a character based on the legendary queen Cordelia. The name is of uncertain origin. It is popularly associated with Latin cor (genitive cordis) "heart", and has also been linked with the  Welsh name Creiddylad, allegedly meaning "jewel of the sea", but it may derive from the French coeur de lion "heart of a lion".

Notable people with the name
 Cordelia of Britain, legendary queen of the Britons, youngest daughter of King Leir
Cordelia Bugeja, British actress
Cordelia Cameron, Australian actor-manager
Cordelia Throop Cole (1833–1900), American social reformer
Cordelia Fine, British academic psychologist and writer
Cordelia Agnes Greene (1831–1905), physician, philanthropist and suffragist from Upstate New York
Cordelia Harvey, First Lady of Wisconsin Governor Louis Harvey, known for founding Civil War Orphans' homes and advocating for war field hospital conditions
Cordelia Hawkins, eponym of the U.S. town of Cordele, Georgia
Cordelia James, Baroness James of Rusholme, British educator and justice of the peace
Cordelia Knott, wife of Walter Knott and founder of Mrs. Knott's Chicken Dinner Restaurant at Knott's Berry Farm
Cordelia Scaife May, American heiress and philanthropist
Cordelia Urueta Sierra (1908–1995), Mexican artist
Cordelia Mendoza, American antiquarian and appraiser
Cordelia Strube, Canadian playwright and novelist
Cordelia Wilson, American painter of New Mexico and American Southwest landscapes

Fictional characters
A supposed anglicization of Creiddylad, the name of a character in Welsh mythology

Cordelia (King Lear), a central character in William Shakespeare's tragic play King Lear
Cordelia, the main character of the eponymous Dutch adult comic strip by Belgian cartoonist "ILAH" (Inge Heremans)
Cordelia, character in James Lapine and William Finn's 1990 off-Broadway musical Falsettoland and later its two Broadway revivals, renamed Falsettos
Cordelia Frost, character in MARVEL's "Emma Frost" comics, Emma's sister
Cordelia Chase, character in Joss Whedon's television series Buffy the Vampire Slayer and Angel

Anime
Cordelia Capulet, Japanese anime character in "Romeo x Juliet"
Cordelia Gallo, Japanese anime character in "Gosick"
Cordelia Glauca, Japanese anime character in Tantei Opera Milky Holmes
Cordelia, Japanese anime character in Diabolik Lovers

Films and television shows
Cordelia Abbott, in the television soap opera The Young and The Restless
Cordelia Chase, in the television series Buffy the Vampire Slayer and Angel
Cordelia Foxx, character in American Horror Story: Coven
Cordelia "Cody" Latimer, character in the New Zealand comedy-drama series Go Girls. 
Cordelia Winthrop Scott, from the 2011 film Monte Carlo, played by Selena Gomez
Cordelia Thornberry, in The Wild Thornberrys

Literature
In Kierkegaard’s Either/OrEither/Or in the section of Diary of a Seducer 
In Anne of Green Gables, Anne requests that she be called Cordelia rather than Anne
Cordelia Blake, title character of the Winston Graham novel Cordelia (1949)
Cordelia Flakk, in Jasper Fforde's Lost in a Good Book
Lady Cordelia Flyte, in Brideshead Revisited (1945) by Evelyn Waugh
Cordelia Geard, in John Cowper Powys's novel A Glastonbury Romance (1932)
Cordelia Gray, in two books by P.D. James
Cordelia Ransom, in the Honorverse novels by David Weber
The main character of the short story "Cordelia the Crude" by Wallace Thurman
 Cordelia Naismith Vorkosigan in the Vorkosigan Saga by Lois McMaster Bujold
Cordelia Carstairs, protagonist of The Last Hours series by Cassandra Clare

Video games
 Cordelia, a playable character in Fire Emblem Awakening
 Cordelia, final boss in Panel de Pon
 Cordelia, youngest daughter of King Regna, in Triangle Strategy

References

English feminine given names